Žiga Jeglič (born 24 February 1988) is a Slovenian ice hockey player who is currently playing for Fischtown Pinguins of the Deutsche Eishockey Liga (DEL). He is also a member of the Slovenia men's national ice hockey team.

Playing career
During the 2013–14 season he has won the German championship with ERC Ingolstadt. Jeglič was an important part in ERC Ingolstadt's success, and was tied second in scoring during the 2013–14 playoffs with 15 points (4 goals, 11 assists) in 21 postseason games.

On 20 February 2018, during the 2018 Winter Olympics, Žiga Jeglič tested positive for fenoterol in an in-competition test.

Career statistics

Regular season and playoffs

International

References

External links
 

1988 births
Living people
Ässät players
Doping cases in ice hockey
ERC Ingolstadt players
Fischtown Pinguins players
HC Slovan Bratislava players
HK Acroni Jesenice players
HC Neftekhimik Nizhnekamsk players
Ice hockey players at the 2014 Winter Olympics
Ice hockey players at the 2018 Winter Olympics
Olympic ice hockey players of Slovenia
Slovenian ice hockey left wingers
Slovenian sportspeople in doping cases
Sportspeople from Kranj
Torpedo Nizhny Novgorod players
Södertälje SK players
Slovenian expatriate sportspeople in Slovakia
Slovenian expatriate sportspeople in Sweden
Slovenian expatriate sportspeople in Russia
Slovenian expatriate sportspeople in Finland
Slovenian expatriate sportspeople in the Czech Republic
Slovenian expatriate sportspeople in Germany
Expatriate ice hockey players in Slovakia
Expatriate ice hockey players in Sweden
Expatriate ice hockey players in Russia
Expatriate ice hockey players in Finland
Expatriate ice hockey players in the Czech Republic
Expatriate ice hockey players in Germany
Slovenian expatriate ice hockey people